This is a list of cities and towns in Lebanon distributed according to district. There are total 1000 districts. 56.21% of the population lives in 19 cities and towns, which gives the average 2,158 people per town.

Largest cities

NB: Some of these numbers are either approximations and outdated.

Akkar Governorate

Akkar District (18)

 Arqa
 Akroum
 Andaket
 Bebnine
 Berkayel
 Beino
 Chadra
 Cheikh Mohammad
 Cheikh Taba 
 Daoura
 Denbo
 Halba
 Hisah
 Kobayat
 Massoudieh
 Miniara
 Mish Mish
 Rahbe

Baalbek-Hermel Governorate

Baalbek District (52)

 Ain
 Ainata
 Arsal
 Baalbek
 Barka
 Bednayel
 Bechouat
 Beit Chama - Aaqidiyeh
 Brital
 Btadhi
 Bodai
 Chaat
 Chlifa
 Chmestar - Gharbi Baalbeck
 Deir el Ahmar
 Douriss
 Fakiha - Jdeydeh
 Fleweh
 Hadath Baalbek
 Harbata
 Hizzine
 Hlabta
 Hosh Barada
 Hosh el Rafika
 Hosh Snid
 Hosh Tal Safiya
 Iaat
 Jabbouleh
 Janta
 Jebaa (Baalbek)
 Kasarnaba
 Khodr
 Khraibeh
 Kneisseh
 Labweh
 Majdloun
 Mikna
 Nabi Chit
 Nabi Othman
 Qaa
 Qarha
 Ram - Jbenniyeh
 Ras Baalbek
 Ras el Hadis
 Saayde
 Seriine el Fawka
 Seriine el Tahta
 Talya
 Taraya
 Tayba
 Temnin el Fawka
 Temnin el Tahta
 Wadi Faara
 Yammouneh
 Younine

Hermel District 

 Chawaghir el Fawka Wal Tahta
 Hermel
 Jouar el Hachich
 Kasser - Fisane
 Kouakh

Beirut Governorate

Marfaa (Port)	المَرْفَأ	 
Mina El-Hosn		ميناء الحُصن
Zuqaq El-Blat		زْقاق الِبْلاط		
Bachoura		الباشورَة
Achrafieh		الأَشْرَفِيِّة			
Saifi		         الصَّيْفي
Dar El-Mreisseh		دار الِمْريسِة			
Ras Beirut		*رأس بيروت
Mousaitbeh		الِمْصَيطْبِِة			
Mazraa		         المَزْرَعَة
Rmeil		         الرّميل			
Medawar		          الِمْدَوَّر

Mount Lebanon Governorate

Aley District (53)

 Abey - Ain Drafil
 Aghmid
 Ain trez
 Ain Dara
 Ain el Remmaneh
 Ain el Saydeh
 Ain Jedideh
 Ain Ksour
 Ain Onoub
 Ainab
 Aley
 Aramoun el Ghareb
 Baawerta
 Badghan
 Baissour
 Bassatine
 Bchamoun
 Bdadoun
 Bemkine
 Bennieh
 Bhamdoun el Balda
 Bhamdoun el Mhatta
 Bkhechtey
 Bleibel
 Bmahray
 Bserrine
 Bsouss
 Btalloun
 Btater
 Chanay (Lebanon)
 Charoun
 Chartoun
 Chemlan
 Choueifat
 Deir Koubel
 Dfoun
 Eitat
 Houmal
 Kehaleh
 Keyfoun
 Kfaraamey
 Kfar Matta
 Kommatyeh
 Majdelbaana
 Mansourieh - Ain el Marej
 Mecherfeh (Aley)
 Mejdlaya (Aley)
 Rajmeh
 Ramlieh
 Ras el Jabal
 Rechmaya
 Remhala
 Rouaysset el Neeman
 Saoufar
 Souk el Ghareb
 Taazanieh

Baabda District

Note: starred cities are part of metropolitan Beirut.

Byblos District (57)

 Afqa
 Ain el-Ghouaybeh
 Ain Jrain
 Akoura
 Almat el-Chemalieh
 Almat el-Janubieh
 Almat - Souaneh
 Amsheet
 Arab Ellahib
 Bechealeh
 Bechtlida - Fidar
 Bejjeh
 Bekhaaz
 Berbara
 Blat
 Byblos
 Chmout
 Edde
 Ehmej
 Fatreh
 Fghal
 Ghalboun
 Gharzouz
 Halat
 Hboub
 Helwe
 Hjoula
 Hosrayel
 Hsoun
 Jaj
 Janneh
 Jeddayel
 Kfar Baal
 Kfarsela
 Kour El-Hawa
 Laqlouq
 Lassa
 Lehfed
 Maad
 Machen
 Mejdel
 Mastita
 Mayfouq - Qottara
 Mazraat es-Siyad
 Mghayreh
 Mishmish
 Monsif
 Nahr Ibrahim
 Oqayba
 Qartaba
 Ras Osta
 Rihaneh
 Safra
 Shikhan
 Tartej
 Yanouh
 Zebdin

Chouf District (70)

 Ainbal
 Ain Kani
 Ain Wzein
 Ain Zhalta
 Ammatour
 Ammik
 Anout
 Atrine
 Baakline
 Baasir
 Baatharan
 Barja
 Barouk - Freydiss
 Bater
 Batloun
 Bchetfine
 Beiteddine
 Berjein & Mreyjat
 Botme
 Brih
 Bsaba
 Dahr El Maghara
 Dalhoun
 Damour
 Daraya
 Dibbiyeh
 Deir Dourit
 Deir el Qamar
 Deir Kouche
 Dmit
 Fouara
 Gharife
 Haret Jandal
 Hasrout
 Jadra
 Jahlieh
 Jbeih
 Jdaideh
 Jiyeh
 Joun
 Kahlouniye
 Ketermaya
 Kfarfakoud
 Kfarhim
 Kfarkatra
 Kfar Nabrakh
 Kfarniss
 Khraybeh
 Knayse
 Maasser Beiteddine
 Maasser el Chouf
 Majdel Meouch
 Mazboud
 Mazraat el Chouf
 Mazraat el Daher
 Mechref
 Mghayrie
 Moukhtara
 Mristeh
 Naameh
 Niha Chouf
 Rmeileh
 Sebline
 Semkanieh
 Serjbel
 Shheem
 Wadi Sit
 Warhanieh
 Werdanieh
 Zaarourieh

Keserwan District (47)

 Achqout
 Adonis
 ain-bzil
 Ain el Rihaneh
 Aintoura
 Ajaltoun
 Akaybeh
 Aramoun
 Azra & Ozor
 Ballouneh
 Batha
 Bekaatat Achkout
 Bouar
 Bezhel & Mradyeh
 Bqaatouta (Bkaatouta)
 Chahtoul & Jouret Mehad
 Chnaniir
 daher sarba
 Daraya
 Daraoun - Harissa
 Dlebta
 Faitroun
 Faraya
 Fatqa
 Ghazir
 Ghbaleh
 Ghedrass
 Ghosta
 Ghyneh
 Hiyata
 Hosein
 Hrajel
 Jdeideh - Harharaya - Kattine
 Jeita
 Jounieh
 Jouret Termos
 Kfardebian
 Kfour
 Kleiat
 Maaysra
 Mayrouba
 Raachine
 Rayfoun
 Safra
 Sarba
 Sehayleh
 Tabarja - Adma - Dafne - Kfaryassine
 Wata el Jawz
 Yahchouch
 Zaaytre
 Zeytoun
 Zouk Mikael
 Zouk Mosbeh

Matn District

| Fanar|| 15,000|

Note: starred cities are part of metropolitan Beirut.

Beqaa Governorate

Rashaya District (26)

 Ain Arab
 Ain Ata, 3rd highest village were people can live in the Middle East
 Ain Harcha
 Akabeh
 Ayha
 Ayta el Fekhar
 Bakifa
 Bekka
 Beit Lahia
 Bireh
 Daher el Ahmar
 Deir El Aachayer
 Helwa
 Hoch
 Kaukaba
 Kfar Danis
 Kfarfouk
 Kfar Mechki
 Kherbet Rouha
 Majdel Balhiss
 Mdoukha
 Mhaydseh
 Rashaya
 Al-Rafid
 Tannoura
 Yanta

Western Beqaa District (27)

 Ain el Tineh
 Ain Zebdeh
 Ammik
 Ana
 Aitanite
 Baaloul
 Bab Mareh
 Ghaza
 Hoch Harimeh
 Jeb Jennine
 Kamed el Laouz
 Karaoun
 Kefraya
 Kelya
 Khiara
 Lala, Lebanon
 Lebbaya
 Machghara
 Manara
 Mansoura
 Marej
 Meidoun
 Qanafar Ville
 Saghbine
 Sawiri
 Sohmor
 Sultan Yaakoub
 Tall Znoub
 Yehmor
 Zilaya

Zahlé District (29)

 Ablah
 Ain Kfarzabad
 Ali el Nahri
 BarElias
 Bouarej
 Chtaura
 Deir el Ghazal
 Ferzol
 Hay el Fikany
 Hezerta
 Hoch Moussa - Anjar
 Jdita
 Kaah el Rim
 Kab Elias - Wadi el Deloum
 Kfarzabad
 Kousaya
 Majdel Anjar
 Massa
 Mekssi
 Mrayjat
 Nabi Ayla
 Niha
 Rhit
 Riyak - Hoch Hala
 Saadnayel
 Taalabaya
 Taanayel
 Terbol
 Zahlé - Maalaka

Nabatieh Governorate

Bint Jbeil District (33)

 Ain Ebel
 Aynata
 Ayta el Chaeb
 Ayta el Jabal
 Aytaroun
 Beit Lif
 Beit Yahoun
 Bint Jbeil
 Borj Kalaway
 Braachit
 Chakra wa Doubeih
 Debel
 Deir Antar
 Froun
 Ghandouriyeh
 Hanine
 Hariss
 Hdatha
 Jmeyjmeh
 Kafra
 Kalaway
 Kawzah
 Kfardounine
 Khirbet Selm
 Kounine
 Maroun el Ras
 Ramyah
 Rchaf
 Rmeich
 Serbine
 As-Sultaniyah
 Tebnine
 Teir Zebba
 Tiri
 Yaroun
 Yater

Hasbaya District (15)

 Ain Kanya
 Chwayya
 Fardiss
 Hasbaya
 Hbariyeh
 Kawkaba
 Kfarchouba
 Kfarhamam
 Kfeir
 Khalouat
 Mari
 Marj el Zhour
 Mimass
 Rachaya el Fokhar
 Shebaa

Marjeyoun District (25)

 Adayseh
 Adchit
 Bani Hayann
 Blat
 Blida
 Bourj El-Moulouk
 Debbine
 Deir Mimas
 Deir Syriane
 Ebel El Saqi
 Houla
 Jdeidet Marjeyoun
 Kabrikha
 Kantara
 Kfarkila
 Khiam
 Klayaa
 Majdel Selem
 Markaba
 Mays el Jabal
 Rab Thalathine
 Sawaneh
 Tallousseh
 Taybeh
 Wazzany

Nabatieh District (38)

 Adchit
 Ain Qana
 Ansar
 Arabsalim
 Arnoun
 Breykaah
 Charkiyeh
 Choukine
 Deir el Zahrani
 Doueir
 Ebba
 Habbouch
 Harouf
 Houmin el Fawka
 Houmin el Tahta
 Jarjouh
 Jbaa - Ain Bouswar
 Jebchit
 Kaakaiyet el Jisr
 Kafarkela
 Kfarfila
 Kfarremane
 Kfarsir
 Kfartebnit
 Kfour
 Kossaybeh
 Mayfadoun
 Nabatieh el Fawka
 Nabatieh el Tahta
 Namiriyeh
 Roumine
 Sarba (Nabatiyeh)
 Siney
 Sir el Gharbiyeh
 Yehmor el Chekif
 Zawtar el Charkiyeh
 Zawtar el Gharbiyeh
 Zebdine
 Zefta (Nabatiyeh)

North Governorate

Batroun District (21)

 Ajdabra
 Assia
 Batroun
 Bchaaleh
 bhannine 
 Bkesmaya
 Chebtine
 Chekka
 Douma
 Eddeh
 Hamat
 Hardine - Beit Kassab
 Heri
 Ibrine
 Kfar Abida
 Kfarhay
 Kfour el Arabi
 KfarHilda
 Kobba
 Mrah El Zeyat
 Ram
 Ras Nahhache
 Selaata
 Tannourine
 Toula
 Zan

Bsharri District (11)

 Abdine
 Barhelyoun
 Bazooun
 Beit Mounzer
 Bkaakafra
 Bkerkacha
 Blawza
 Bolla, Lebanon
 Braissat
 Bsharri
 Dimane
 Hadath El Jebbeh
 Hadchit
 Hasroun
 Qnat
 Qnaywer
 Tourza

Koura District (34)

 Aaba
 Afsaddik
 Ain Ekrine
 Ajed Ibrine
 Amioun
 Anfeh
 Barsa
 Batroumine
 Bdebba
 Bechmezzine
 Bednayel
 Bkeftine
 Bsarma
 Bterram
 Btouratij
 Bziza
 Dar Beechtar
 Dhour ElHawa
 Dar Chmezzine
 Deddeh
 Fih
 Kaftoun
 Kelhat
 Kifraya
 Kfarakka
 Kfarhata
 Kfarhazir
 Kfarkahel
 Kfarsaroun
 Kosba
 Mejdel - Zakzouk - Wata Fares
 Metrite
 Nakhleh
 Rasmaska
 Rechdebbine
 Zakroun

Miniyeh-Danniyeh District (18)

 Asoun
 Bakhoun
 Beddawi - Wadi Nahe
 Beit el Fokss
 Bekaasafrine
 Bhannine & Artousa
 Bkarsouna - Kattine
 Btermaz
 Deir Ammar
 Deir Nbouh
 Haql El Aazime
 Karm el Moher
 Kfarchalane
 Kfarhabou
 Minyeh
 Mrah Sraj
 Nemrine & Bkaouza
 Sfireh
 Sir
 Tarane

Tripoli District (3)

 Al-Qalamoun
 Mina
 Tripoli

Zgharta District (31)

 Aarjes
 Aintourine
 Aitou
 Alma
 Arbet Kozhaya
 Ardeh
 Basloukit
 Bhairet Toula
 Bnachii
 Daraya - Bchennine
 Ejbeh
 Haret Al Fawar
 Iaal
 Karahbache
 Karmsaddeh
 Kfardlakos
 Kfarfou
 Kfarhata
 Kfarsghab- Morh Kfarsghab
 Kfarshakhna
 Kfaryachit - Besbeel
 Kfarzeina
 Mazraat Al Toufah
 Mejdlaya
 Mizyara - Haref - Hmayss - Sakhra
 Miriata - Kadrieh
 Rachiine
 Raskifa
 Sebhel
 Serhel
 Toula - Aslout
 Zgharta - Ehden

South Governorate

Jezzine District (35)

 Aychieh
 Azour
 Baissour
 Barta
 Beba
 Benweteh
 Bisri
 Bkassine
 Boslaya
 Bteddine el Lekech
 Haref
 Haytoura
 Homsiyeh
 Jarmak
 Jernaya
 Jezzine - Ain Majdaleyn
 Kfarfalous
 Kfarhouna
 Kfarjarrah
 Karkha
 Kattine - Hidab
 Lebaa
 Louaizeh
 Machmouche
 Maknounieh
 Midane
 Mjeydel
 Mlikh
 Rimat - Chkadif
 Roum
 Sabbah
 Saydoun
 Sfaray
 Snaya
 Sojod
 Teid
 Wadi El Laymoun
 Wadi Jezzine
 Zhalta

Sidon District (15)

 Aadloun
 Aabra
 Anqoun
 Ghazieh
 Insariat
 Kfar Melki
 Kharayeb
 Maghdouché
 Merouaniyeh
 Miye ou Miye
 Sidon
 Saksakiyeh
 Sarafand
 Tafahta
 Zrarieh

Tyre District (25)

 Aaytit
 Abbassieh
 Ain Baal
 Barich
 Bayyad
 Bazourieh
 Borj el Chamali
 Borj Rahal
 Chehour
 Deir Kanoun al Ain
 Deir Kanoun Naher
 Jwaya
 Maarake
 Maaroub
 Majadel
 Nakoura
 Qana
 Qlaileh
 Siddikine
 Srifa
 Tayr Debba
 Tayr Falsay
 Toura
 Tyre
 Zibkin

See also
List of municipalities of Lebanon

References

 
Lebanon, List of cities in
Cities and towns
Lebanon